The Nat King Cole Songbook is a 1965 studio album by Sammy Davis Jr., recorded in tribute to singer and pianist Nat King Cole, who had recently died.

Track listing 
 "Rambling Rose" (Joe Sherman, Noel Sherman) – 2:27
 "Unforgettable" (Irving Gordon) – 2:32
 "Straighten Up and Fly Right" (Nat King Cole, Irving Mills) – 2:45
 "Pretend" (Lew Douglas, Frank LaVere, Cliff Parman) – 3:10
 "Ballerina" (Bob Russell, Carl Sigman) – 2:21
 "It's Only a Paper Moon" (Harold Arlen, Yip Harburg, Billy Rose) – 2:19
 "Smile" (Charlie Chaplin, Geoff Parsons, John Turner) – 2:40
 "Walkin' My Baby Back Home" (Fred E. Ahlert, Roy Turk) – 2:37
 "Route 66" (Bobby Troup) – 2:43
 "For Sentimental Reasons" (William Best, Deek Watson) – 2:12
 "Send for Me" (Ollie Jones) – 2:25
 "Sweet Lorraine" (Cliff Burwell, Mitchell Parish) – 2:57
 "The Christmas Song" (Mel Tormé, Bob Wells) – 3:25
 "Mona Lisa"/"Too Young"/"Nature Boy" (Ray Evans, Jay Livingston)/(Sylvia Dee, Sid Lippman)/(eden ahbez) – 5:02

Personnel 
 Sammy Davis Jr. - vocals
 Billy May - arranger
 Claus Ogerman

References 

1965 albums
Sammy Davis Jr. albums
Nat King Cole tribute albums
Albums arranged by Billy May
Albums arranged by Claus Ogerman
Reprise Records albums
Albums produced by Gordon Anderson (record producer)